Cimarron is a 1931 pre-Code epic Western film directed by Wesley Ruggles, starring Richard Dix and Irene Dunne, and featuring Estelle Taylor and Roscoe Ates. The Oscar-winning script was written by Howard Estabrook based on the 1930 Edna Ferber novel Cimarron. It would be RKO's most expensive production up to that date, and its winning of the top Oscar for Outstanding Production would be one of only two for Outstanding Production ever won by that studio. It is also the first of only three Westerns to ever win the top honor at the Academy Awards (the others being Dances with Wolves in 1990 and Unforgiven in 1992). Epic in scope, spanning forty years from 1889 to 1929, it was a critical success, although it did not recoup its production costs during its initial run in 1931.

Plot
The Oklahoma land rush of 1889 prompts thousands to travel to the Oklahoma Territory to grab free government land; Yancey Cravat (Richard Dix) and his young bride, Sabra (Irene Dunne) cross the border from Kansas to join the throngs. In the ensuing race, Yancey is outwitted by a young prostitute, Dixie Lee (Estelle Taylor), who takes the prime piece of real estate, the Bear Creek claim, that Yancey had targeted for himself.

His plans for establishing a ranch thwarted, Yancey moves into the town of Osage, a boomer town, where he confronts and kills Lon Yountis (Stanley Fields), an outlaw who had killed the prior publisher of the local newspaper. Having a background in publishing himself, Yancey establishes the Oklahoma Wigwam, a weekly newspaper, to help turn the frontier camp into a respectable town. After the birth of their daughter, Donna, a gang of outlaws threatens Osage, led by "The Kid" (William Collier Jr.), who happens to be an old acquaintance of Yancey's. To save the town, Yancey faces and kills The Kid.

Beset by guilt over his killing of The Kid, when another land rush appears, Yancey leaves Sabra and his children to participate in settling the Cherokee Strip. After his departure, Sabra takes over the publication of the Oklahoma Wigwam, and raises her children until Yancey returns five years later, just in time to represent Dixie Lee, who had been charged with being a public nuisance, and win her acquittal.

Osage continues to grow, as does the Territory of Oklahoma, which gains statehood in 1907 and benefits from the early oil boom of the 1900s, including the Native American tribes, that Yancey supports, through editorials in his newspaper, after which Yancey once again disappears from Osage for several years. At the time, Sabra is vehemently anti-Native American, despite her son's involvement with an Indian woman. Years later, when Sabra becomes the first female member of Congress from the state of Oklahoma, she lauds the virtues of her by-then Indian daughter-in-law.

Sabra and Yancey are reunited one final time when she rushes to his side after he has rescued numerous oil drillers from a devastating explosion. He dies in her arms.

Cast
 Richard Dix as Yancey Cravat
 Irene Dunne as Sabra Cravat
 Estelle Taylor as Dixie Lee
 Nance O'Neil as Felice Venable
 William Collier Jr. as The Kid
 Roscoe Ates as Jesse Rickey
 George E. Stone as Sol Levy
 Stanley Fields as Lon Yountis
 Robert McWade as Louis Hefner
 Edna May Oliver as Tracy Wyatt
 Judith Barrett as Donna Cravat
 Eugene Jackson as Isaiah
 Dennis O'Keefe (uncredited)

(Principal cast list as per AFI database, and The RKO Story)

Production
Despite being in the depths of the Great Depression, RKO Radio Pictures invested more than $1.5 million into production of Ferber's novel. Filming began in the summer of 1930 at Jasmin Quinn Ranch outside of Los Angeles, California, where the land rush scenes were shot. More than twenty-eight cameramen, and numerous camera assistants and photographers, were used to capture scenes of more than 5,000 costumed extras, covered wagons, buckboards, surreys, and bicyclists as they raced across grassy hills and prairie to stake their claim. Cinematographer Edward Cronjager planned out every take (that recalled the scenes of Intolerance some fifteen years earlier) in accordance with Ferber's descriptions. In order to film key scenes for this production, RKO purchased 89 acres in Encino where construction of Art Director Max Ree's Oscar-winning design of a complete western town and a three-block modern main street were built to represent the fictional Oklahoma boomtown of Osage. These award-winning sets eventually formed the nucleus of RKO's expansive movie ranch, in Encino, where other RKO (and non-RKO) films were later shot.

Reception

Contemporary reviews
RKO Radio Pictures premiered Cimarron at the RKO Palace Theatre (Broadway) in New York City on January 26, 1931, to much praise, and then on February 6 a Los Angeles Orpheum Theatre premiere followed, that also included personal appearances of Richard Dix and Irene Dunne, a stage show and an augmented orchestra. Three days later, the movie was released to theaters throughout the nation. Despite being a critical success, the extremely high budget and ongoing Depression combined against the film. While it was a commercial success in line with other films of the day, RKO Pictures could not at first recoup their heavy investment in the film, that ended up losing $565,000. However, it recouped some more money on a 1935 re-release that enjoyed another premiere in Oklahoma City at the (John Eberson designed) Midwest Theatre. The movie remained RKO's most expensive film until 1939's Gunga Din (that filmed exteriors around the Sierra Nevada Alabama Hills range, but had one scene shot on RKO's movie ranch in Encino).

Reviews by film critics were overwhelmingly positive at the time. Variety led off its review with, "An elegant example of super film making and a big money picture. This is a spectacular western away from all others. It holds action, sentiment, sympathy, thrills and comedy – and 100% clean. Radio Pictures has a corker in 'Cimarron'." The review went on to praise the actors, particularly Dix and Oliver, as well as the direction, stating, "Wesley Ruggles apparently gets the full credit for this splendid and heavy production. His direction misses nothing in the elaborate scenes, as well as in the usual film making procedure." The magazine specifically pointed out the quality of the make-up in the aging of the principle players, who have to go through forty years on-screen.

Mordaunt Hall of The New York Times also gave the film a stellar review, calling it, "A graphic and engrossing screen conception of Edna Ferber's widely read novel ...", and also praised the handling of the passage of time in this epic. Hall also singled out the performance of Dunne. Motion Picture Magazine raved, "A great and worthy effort, this transcription of early Oklahoma life will be hailed as one of the high-spots of the year. It has everything. RKO seems to have placed no restrictions upon making it a lavish, bona-fide epic."

John Mosher of The New Yorker praised the "great care" that had been taken with the historical accuracy of the film's visual details, that he thought "as good as anything that has come out of Hollywood, and because of this expertness the film gains especial value". He also wrote that Richard Dix was "certainly at his best in this role". His only criticisms concerned the second half of the film, that he thought had "sagging moments" and an ending that was too abrupt. The Evening Independent called it "a notable addition to the small list of pictures that the years have given to the American theater. For in Cimarron is vested stirring drama, stark beauty, daring and adventure on a plane that is seldom seen on the screen." The West Seattle Herald declared that it was "even more powerful than the great story read by millions in America. Cimarron the picture is all that is gripping in Cimarron the story. Spectacular scenes abound in this production."

Elizabeth Yeaman of the Hollywood Daily Citizen saw the film as a new type of history, writing that, “Like history, the picture has moments of thrilling glory and moments of repetition and daily routine. Cimarron does not follow the rules of story construction... It is, in short, a graphic interpretation of a portion of history, the history of the state of Oklahoma from the time of the first great land rush until the present.”

Retrospective reviews
More recent appraisals of the film have not been as positive. Cimarron currently holds a "Rotten" 52% rating on Rotten Tomatoes, based on 31 reviews, with a weighted average of 4.9/10. The site's consensus reads: "Cimarron is supported by a strong performance from Irene Dunne, but uneven in basically every other regard, and riddled with potentially offensive stereotypes." 

Assessing the film in 2009, James Berardinelli called it "an excellent study of how tastes have changed over the years. Critically lauded at the time of its release, Cimarron was beloved by most who saw it. Eight decades later, it is frequently cited on lists of the most undeserving Academy Award winners and is rightfully impugned for racist overtones and scattershot storytelling." 

Steve Evans of DVD Verdict wrote, "Seen with contemporary eyes, the film is badly dated, slow moving, and pocked with racist caricatures....The recreation of the great 1889 Oklahoma Land Rush remains an exciting spectacle....Unfortunately, the film never manages to top this opening shot."

Awards and honors
At the 1931 Academy Awards ceremony at the Biltmore Hotel in Los Angeles, Cimarron was the first film to receive more than six Academy Awards nominations and be nominated for the Big Five awards (Best Picture, Best Director, Best Actor, Best Actress, and Best Writing). Additionally, it is one of only two films (the other being Who's Afraid of Virginia Woolf?) to receive nominations in every eligible category. It won for three of them, including Best Picture.  It would win the first of only two Best Picture Oscars for the studio, the other being awarded to 1946's The Best Years of Our Lives. It was the first Western to win the Best Picture award, and remained the only Western genre film with that honor until 1990, when Dances with Wolves won.

1930–1931 Academy Awards

References

External links

1931 films
Best Picture Academy Award winners
RKO Pictures films
American black-and-white films
American Western (genre) epic films
Films set in Oklahoma
1930s English-language films
Films based on American novels
Films scored by Max Steiner
Films directed by Wesley Ruggles
Films whose writer won the Best Adapted Screenplay Academy Award
Films whose art director won the Best Art Direction Academy Award
Films set in the 1880s
Films set in the 1890s
Films set in the 1900s
Films set in the 1920s
1931 Western (genre) films
Films based on Western (genre) novels
Films based on works by Edna Ferber
Photoplay Awards film of the year winners
1930s American films